The 2003 San Diego Padres season was the 35th season in franchise history.  The team was managed by Bruce Bochy, as the team played their final season of home games at Qualcomm Stadium before moving the club to Petco Park the following season.

Offseason
 November 19, 2002: Jesse Orosco signed as a free agent with the San Diego Padres.
December 10, 2002: Jaret Wright signed as a free agent with the San Diego Padres.

Regular season

Opening Day starters
Gary Bennett
Sean Burroughs
Ryan Klesko
Mark Kotsay
Brian Lawrence
Mark Loretta
Xavier Nady
Ramon Vazquez
Rondell White

Notable transactions
June 3, 2003: Tim Stauffer was drafted by the San Diego Padres in the 1st round (4th pick) of the 2003 amateur draft. Player signed August 9, 2003.
June 3, 2003: Dirk Hayhurst was drafted by the San Diego Padres in the 8th round of the 2003 amateur draft. Player signed June 10, 2003.
July 22, 2003: Jesse Orosco was sent to the New York Yankees by the San Diego Padres as part of a conditional deal. 
August 12, 2003: Jason Bay was traded by the San Diego Padres with a player to be named later and Óliver Pérez to the Pittsburgh Pirates for Brian Giles. The San Diego Padres sent Corey Stewart (minors) (October 2, 2003) to the Pittsburgh Pirates to complete the trade. 
August 15, 2003: Jaret Wright was selected off waivers by the Atlanta Braves from the San Diego Padres.

Season standings

National League West

Record vs. opponents

Roster

Player stats

Batting

Starters by position
Note: Pos = Position: G = Games played; AB = At bats; H = Hits; Avg. = Batting average; HR = Home runs; RBI = Runs batted in

Other batters
Note: G = Games played; AB = At bats; H = Hits; Avg. = Batting average; HR = Home runs; RBI = Runs batted in

Pitching

Starting pitchers
Note: G = Games pitched; IP = Innings pitched; W = Wins; L = Losses; ERA = Earned run average; SO = Strikeouts

Other pitchers
Note: G = Games pitched; IP = Innings pitched; W = Wins; L = Losses; ERA = Earned run average; SO = Strikeouts

Relief pitchers
Note: G = Games pitched; W = Wins; L = Losses; SV = Saves; ERA = Earned run average; SO = Strikeouts

Award winners

2003 Major League Baseball All-Star Game
 Rondell White

Farm system

References

External links
 2003 San Diego Padres at Baseball Reference
 2003 San Diego Padres at Baseball Almanac

 

San Diego Padres seasons
San Diego Padres Season, 2003
San Diego Padres